The Saint Patrick's Day Test also known as the Donnybrook Cup was an international rugby league football match played between the United States and Ireland from 1995 to 2012. The game was usually held on or around March 17 to coincide with Saint Patrick's Day. There have been eight matches, with five won by the USA and three won by Ireland. Ireland competed as a full test side for the first two matches, winning both. In 2020 the first two fixtures were regarded to full international status as the Ireland A teams for those two games were upgraded to senior national status, due to the similarity of the squads involved in those games. In 2021 USARL and RLI were in talks to re-establish back the fixture in 2023.

Matches

References

Rugby league international tournaments
Rugby league in Ireland
Rugby league in the United States
Irish-American culture in sports
Test